Lusiwe Daureen Ngubane  is a South African politician who has represented the African National Congress (ANC) in the KwaZulu-Natal Provincial Legislature since 2019. She was elected to the provincial legislature in the 2019 general election, ranked 47th on the ANC's provincial party list. She is a member of the ANC's Inkosi Bhambatha branch in Umzinyathi, where she formerly served on the Regional Executive Committee.

References

External links 

 
 Hon. LD Ngubane at KwaZulu-Natal Provincial Legislature

Living people
Year of birth missing (living people)
Members of the KwaZulu-Natal Legislature
African National Congress politicians
21st-century South African politicians
21st-century South African women politicians